The volleyball competitions at the 1983 Southeast Asian Games in the Singapore were held from 29 May to 4 June 1983.

Medal winners

Men's tournament

Preliminary round 

| width=50% valign="top" |

|}

|}

Final round

Semi-finals 

|}

7th place match 

|}

5th place match 

|}

Bronze medal match 

|}

Gold medal match 

|}

Final standing

Women's tournament

Results 

|}

Gold Medal match 

|}

Final standing

References
 https://eresources.nlb.gov.sg/newspapers/Digitised/Article/straitstimes19830603-1.2.129

1983 Southeast Asian Games events
1983 in volleyball
Volleyball at the Southeast Asian Games